Lithops hermetica is a species of plant in the family Aizoaceae. It is endemic to Namibia.  Its natural habitat is rocky areas. It was assessed by Lyndley Craven.

References

hermetica
Endemic flora of Namibia
Taxonomy articles created by Polbot